
Gmina Pakosław is a rural gmina (administrative district) in Rawicz County, Greater Poland Voivodeship, in west-central Poland.

Villages
Gmina Pakosław contains the villages and settlements of Białykał, Chojno, Dębionka, Golejewko, Golejewo, Góreczki Wielkie, Halin, Kubeczki, Niedźwiadki, Osiek, Ostrobudki, Pakosław, Podborowo, Pomocno, Skrzyptowo, Sowy, Sworowo, Zaorle and Zielony Dąb.

Neighbouring gminas
Gmina Pakosław is bordered by the gminas of Jutrosin, Miejska Górka, Milicz and Rawicz.

References
Polish official population figures 2006

Pakoslaw
Rawicz County